Quebec was first called Canada between 1534 and 1763. It was the most developed colony of New France as well as New France's centre, responsible for a variety of dependencies (ex. Acadia, Plaisance, Louisiana, and the Pays d'en Haut). Common themes in Quebec's early history as Canada include the fur trade -because it was the main industry- as well as the exploration of North America, war against the English, and alliances or war with Native American groups.

Following the Seven Years' War, Quebec became a British colony in the British Empire. It was first known as the Province of Quebec (1763–1791), then as Lower Canada (1791–1841), and then as Canada East (1841–1867) as a result of the Lower Canada Rebellion. During this period, the inferior socio-economic status of francophones (because anglophones dominated the natural resources and industries of Quebec), the Catholic church, resistance against cultural assimilation, and isolation from non English-speaking populations were important themes.

Quebec was confederated with Ontario, Nova Scotia, and New Brunswick in 1867, beginning the Confederation of Canada. Important events that mark this period are the World Wars, the Grande Noirceur, the Quiet Revolution (which improved the socio-economic standing of French Canadians and secularized Quebec), and the emergence of the contemporary Quebec sovereignty movement.

These three large periods of Quebec's history are represented on its coat of arms with three fleur-de-lis, followed by a lion, and then three maple leaves.

History

Indigenous societies
Aboriginal settlements were located across the area of present-day Quebec before the arrival of Europeans. In the northernmost areas of the province, Inuit communities can be found. Other aboriginal communities belong to the following First Nations:

Abenakis
Algonquins
Atikamekw
Crees
Innu
Malecite
Mi'kmaq
Mohawks
Naskapi
Wendats

The aboriginal cultures of present-day Quebec are diverse, with their own languages, way of life, economies, and religious beliefs. Before contact with Europeans, they did not have a written language, and passed their history and other cultural knowledge along to each generation through oral tradition.

Today around three-quarters of Quebec's aboriginal populations lives in small communities scattered throughout the rural areas of the province, with some living on reserves.

Jacques Cartier sailed into the St. Lawrence River in 1534 and established an ill-fated colony near present-day Quebec City at the site of Stadacona, a village of the St. Lawrence Iroquoians. Linguists and archaeologists have determined these people were distinct from the Iroquoian nations encountered by later French and Europeans, such as the five nations of the Haudenosaunee. Their language was Laurentian, one of the Iroquoian family. By the late 16th century, they had disappeared from the St. Lawrence Valley.

Paleo-Indian Era (11,000–8000 BC)
Existing archaeological evidence attests to a human presence on the current territory of Quebec sometime around 10,000 BC.

Archaic era (8000–1500 BC)
The Paleoindian period was followed by the Archaic, a time when major changes occurred in the landscape and the settlement of the territory of Quebec. With the end of glaciation, the inhabitable territory increased in size and the environment (such as climate, vegetation, lakes and rivers) became increasingly stable. Migrations became rarer and moving around became a seasonal activity necessary for hunting, fishing or gathering.

The nomadic populations of the Archaic period were better established and were very familiar with the resources of their territories. They adapted to their surroundings and experienced a degree of population growth. Their diet and tools diversified. Aboriginal peoples used a greater variety of local material, developed new techniques, such as polishing stone, and devised increasingly specialized tools, such as knives, awls, fish hooks, and nets.

Woodland era (3000 BC–1500 AD)
Agriculture appeared experimentally toward the 8th century. It was only in the 14th century that it was fully mastered in the Saint Lawrence River valley. The Iroquoians cultivated corn, marrow, sunflowers, and beans.

European explorations
In the 14th century, the Byzantine Empire fell. For the Christian West, this made trade with the Far East, usually for things like spices and gold, more difficult because sea routes were now under the control of less cooperative Arab and Italian merchants. As such, in the 15th and 16th centuries, the Spanish and Portuguese, and then the English and French, began to search for a new sea route.

In 1508, only 16 years after the first voyage of Christopher Columbus, Thomas Auber, who was likely part of a fishing trip near Newfoundland, brought back a few Amerindians to France. This indicates that in the early 16th century, French navigators ventured in the gulf of the St. Lawrence, along with the Basques and the Spaniards who did the same.

Around 1522–1523, the Italian navigator Giovanni da Verrazzano persuaded King Francis I of France to commission an expedition to find a western route to Cathay (China). Therefore, King Francis I launched a maritime expedition in 1524, led by Giovanni da Verrazzano, to search for the Northwest Passage. Though this expedition was unsuccessful, it established the name "New France" for Northeastern North America.

Jacques Cartier's voyages

On June 24, 1534, French explorer Jacques Cartier planted a cross on the Gaspé Peninsula and took possession of the territory in the name of King François I of France.

On his second voyage on May 26, 1535, Cartier sailed upriver to the St. Lawrence Iroquoian villages of Stadacona, near present-day Quebec City, and Hochelaga, near present-day Montreal. That year, Cartier decided to name the village and its surrounding territories Canada, because he had heard two young natives use the word kanata ("village" in Iroquois) to describe the location. 16th-century European cartographers would quickly adopt this name. Cartier also wrote that he thought he had discovered large amounts of diamonds and gold, but this ended up only being quartz and pyrite. Then, by following what he called the Great River, he traveled West to the Lachine Rapids. There, navigation proved too dangerous for Cartier to continue his journey towards the goal: China. Cartier and his sailors had no choice but to return to Stadaconé and winter there. In the end, Cartier returned to France and took about 10 Native Americans, including the St. Lawrence Iroquoians chief Donnacona, with him. In 1540, Donnacona told the legend of the Kingdom of Saguenay to the King of France. This inspired the king to order a third expedition, this time led by Jean-François de La Rocque de Roberval and with the goal of finding the Kingdom of Saguenay. But, it was unsuccessful.

In 1541, Jean-François Roberval became lieutenant of New France and had the responsibility to build a new colony in America. It was Cartier who established the first French settlement on American soil, Charlesbourg Royal.

France was disappointed after the three voyages of Cartier and did not want to invest further large sums in an adventure with such uncertain outcome. A period of disinterest in the new world on behalf of the French authorities followed. Only at the very end of the 16th century interest in these northern territories was renewed.

Still, even during the time when France did not send official explorers, Breton and Basque fishermen came to the new territories to stock up on codfish and whale oil. Since they were forced to stay for a longer period of time, they started to trade their metal objects for fur provided by the indigenous people. This commerce became profitable and thus the interest in the territory was revived.

Fur commerce made a permanent residence in the country worthwhile. Good relations with the aboriginal providers were necessary. For some fishermen however, a seasonal presence was sufficient. Commercial companies were founded that tried to further the interest of the Crown in colonizing the territory. They demanded that France grant a monopoly to one single company. In return, this company would also take over the colonization of the French American territory. Thus, it would not cost the king much money to build the colony. On the other hand, other merchants wanted commerce to stay unregulated. This controversy was a big issue at the turn of the 17th century.

By the end of the 17th century, a census showed that around 10,000 French settlers were farming along the lower St. Lawrence Valley. By 1700, fewer than 20,000 people of French origin were settled in New France, extending from Newfoundland to the Mississippi, with the pattern of settlement following the networks of the cod fishery and fur trade, although most Quebec settlers were farmers.

New France (1534–1763)

Modern Quebec was part of the territory of New France, the general name for the North American possessions of France until 1763. At its largest extent, before the Treaty of Utrecht, this territory included several colonies, each with its own administration: Canada, Acadia, Hudson Bay, and Louisiana.

The borders of these colonies were not precisely defined, and were open on the western side, as the maps below show:

Around 1580, France became interested in America again, because the fur trade had become important in Europe. France returned to America looking for a specific animal: the beaver. As New France was full of beavers, it became a colonial-trading post where the main activity was the fur trade in the Pays-d'en-Haut. In 1600, Pierre de Chauvin de Tonnetuit founded the first permanent trading post in Tadoussac for expeditions carried out in the Domaine du Roy.

In 1603, Samuel de Champlain travelled to the Saint Lawrence River and, on Pointe Saint-Mathieu, established a defence pact with the Innu, Wolastoqiyik and Micmacs, that would be "a decisive factor in the maintenance of a French colonial enterprise in America despite an enormous numerical disadvantage vis-à-vis the British colonization in the South". Thus also began French military support to the Algonquian and Huron peoples in defence against Iroquois attacks and invasions. These Iroquois attacks would become known as the Beaver Wars and would last from the early 1600s to the early 1700s.

Colony of Canada (1608–1759)

Early years (1608–1663)

Quebec City was founded in 1608 by Samuel de Champlain. Some other towns were founded before, most famously Tadoussac in 1604 which still exists today, but Quebec was the first to be meant as a permanent settlement and not a simple trading post. Over time, it became a province of Canada and all of New France.

The first version of the town was a single large walled building, called the Habitation. A similar Habitation was established in Port Royal in 1605, in Acadia. This arrangement was made for protection against perceived threats from the indigenous people. The difficulty of supplying the city of Quebec from France and the lack of knowledge of the area meant that life was hard. A significant fraction of the population died of hunger and diseases during the first winter. However, agriculture soon expanded and a continuous flow of immigrants, mostly men in search of adventure, increased the population.

The settlement was built as a permanent fur trading outpost. First Nations traded their furs for many French goods such as metal objects, guns, alcohol, and clothing.

The French quickly established trading posts throughout their territory, trading for fur with aboriginal hunters. The coureur des bois, who were freelance traders, explored much of the area themselves. They kept trade and communications flowing through a vast network along the rivers of the hinterland. They established fur trading forts on the Great Lakes (Étienne Brûlé 1615), Hudson Bay (Radisson and Groseilliers 1659–60), Ohio River and Mississippi River (La Salle 1682), as well as the Saskatchewan River and Missouri River (de la Verendrye 1734–1738). This network was inherited by the English and Scottish traders after the fall of the French Empire in Quebec, and many of the coureur des bois became voyageurs for the British.

In 1612, the Compagnie de Rouen received the royal mandate to manage the operations of New France and the fur trade. In 1621, they were replaced by the Compagnie de Montmorency. Then, in 1627, they were substituted by the Compagnie des Cent-Associés. Shortly after being appointed, the Compagnie des Cent-Associés introduced the Custom of Paris and the seigneurial system to New France. They also forbade settlement in New France by anyone other than Roman Catholics. The Catholic Church was given en seigneurie large and valuable tracts of land estimated at nearly 30% of all the lands granted by the French Crown in New France.

Because of war with England, the first two convoys of ships and settlers bound for the colony were waylaid near Gaspé by British privateers under the command of three French-Scottish Huguenot brothers, David, Louis and Thomas Kirke. Quebec was effectively cut off. In 1629, there was the surrender of Quebec, without battle, to English privateers led by David Kirke during the Anglo-French War. On 19 July 1629, with Quebec completely out of supplies and no hope of relief, Champlain surrendered Quebec to the Kirkes without a fight.  Champlain and other colonists were taken to England, where they learned that peace had been agreed (in the 1629 Treaty of Suza) before Quebec's surrender, and the Kirkes were obliged to return their takings.  However, they refused, and it was not until the 1632 Treaty of Saint-Germain-en-Laye that Quebec and all other captured French possessions in North America were returned to New France. Champlain was restored as de facto governor but died three years later.

In 1633, Cardinal Richelieu granted a charter to the Company of One Hundred Associates, which had been created by the Cardinal himself in 1627. This gave the company control over the booming fur trade and land rights across the territory in exchange for the company supporting and expanding settlement in New France (at the time encompassing Acadia, Quebec, Newfoundland, and Louisiana). Specific clauses in the charter included a requirement to bring 4000 settlers into New France over the next 15 years. The company largely ignored the settlement requirements of their charter and focused on the lucrative fur trade, only 300 settlers arriving before 1640. On the verge of bankruptcy, the company lost its fur trade monopoly in 1641 and was finally dissolved in 1662.

In 1634, Sieur de Laviolette founded Trois-Rivières at the mouth of the Saint-Maurice River. In 1642, Paul de Chomedey de Maisonneuve founded Ville-Marie (now Montreal) on Pointe-à-Callière. He chose to found Montreal on an island so that the settlement could be naturally protected against Iroquois invasions. Many heroes of New France come from this period, such as Dollard des Ormeaux, Guillaume Couture, Madeleine de Verchères and the Canadian Martyrs.

Royal province (1663–1760)
 

The establishment of the Conseil souverain, political restructuring which turned New France into a province of France, ended the period of company rule and marked a new beginning in the colonization effort.

In 1663, the Company of New France ceded Canada to the King, King Louis XIV, who officially made New France into a royal province of France. New France would now be a true colony administered by the Sovereign Council of New France from Québec, and which functioned off . A governor-general, assisted by the intendant of New France and the bishop of Québec, would go on to govern the colony of Canada (Montreal, Québec, Trois-Rivières and the Pays-d'en-Haut) and its administrative dependencies: Acadia, Louisiana and Plaisance.

The French settlers were mostly farmers and they were known as "Canadiens" or "Habitants". Though there was little immigration, the colony still grew because of the Habitants' high birth rates. In 1665, the Carignan-Salières regiment developed the string of fortifications known as the "Valley of Forts" to protect against Iroquois invasions.  The Regiment brought along with them 1,200 new men from Dauphiné, Liguria, Piedmont and Savoy. To redress the severe imbalance between single men and women, and boost population growth, King Louis XIV sponsored the passage of approximately 800 young French women (known as les filles du roi) to the colony. In 1666, intendant Jean Talon organized the first census of the colony and counted 3,215 Habitants. Talon also enacted policies to diversify agriculture and encourage births, which, in 1672, had increased the population to 6,700 Canadiens.

In 1686, the Chevalier de Troyes and the Troupes de la Marine seized three northern forts the English had erected on the lands explored by Charles Albanel in 1671 near Hudson Bay. Similarly, in the south, Cavelier de La Salle took for France lands discovered by Jacques Marquette and Louis Jolliet in 1673 along the Mississippi River. As a result, the colony of New France's territory grew to extend from Hudson Bay all the way to the Gulf of Mexico, and would also encompass the Great Lakes.

In the early 1700s, Governor Callières concluded the Great Peace of Montreal, which not only confirmed the alliance between the Algonquian peoples and New France, but also definitively ended the Beaver Wars. In 1701, Pierre Le Moyne d'Iberville founded the district of Louisiana and made its administrative headquarter Biloxi. Its headquarter was later moved to Mobile, and then to New Orleans. In 1738, Pierre Gaultier de Varennes, extended New France to Lake Winnipeg. In 1742, his voyageur sons, François and Louis-Joseph, crossed the Great Plains and discovered the Rocky Mountains.

From 1688 onwards, the fierce competition between the French Empire and British Empire to control North America's interior and monopolize the fur trade pitted New France and its Indigenous allies against the Iroquois and English -primarily in the Province of New York- in a series of four successive wars called the French and Indian Wars by Americans, and the Intercolonial wars in Quebec. The first three of these wars were King William's War (1688-1697), Queen Anne's War (1702-1713), and King George's War (1744-1748). Many notable battles and exchanges of land took place. In 1690, the Battle of Quebec became the first time Québec's defences were tested. In 1713, following the Peace of Utrecht, the Duke of Orléans ceded Acadia and Plaisance Bay to the Kingdom of Great Britain, but retained Île Saint-Jean, and Île-Royale (Cape Breton Island) where the Fortress of Louisbourg was subsequently erected. These losses were significant since Plaisance Bay was the primary communication route between New France and France, and Acadia contained 5,000 Acadians. In the siege of Louisbourg in 1745, the British were victorious, but returned the city to France after war concessions.

Catholic nuns

Outside the home, Canadian women had few domains which they controlled. An important exception came with Roman Catholic nuns. Stimulated by the influence in France of the popular religiosity of the Counter-Reformation, new orders for women began appearing in the seventeenth century and became a permanent feature of Quebec society.

The Ursuline Sisters arrived in Quebec City in 1639, and in Montreal in 1641. They spread as well to small towns. They had to overcome harsh conditions, uncertain funding, and unsympathetic authorities as they engaged in educational and nursing functions.  They attracted endowments and became important landowners in Quebec. Marie de l'Incarnation (1599–1672) was the mother superior at Quebec, 1639–72.

During the 1759 Quebec Campaign of the Seven Years' War, Augustinian nun Marie-Joseph Legardeur de Repentigny, Sœur de la Visitation, managed the Hôpital Général in Quebec City and oversaw the care of hundreds of wounded soldiers from both the French and British forces.  She wrote in after-action report on her work, noting, "The surrender of Quebec only increased our work. The British generals came to our hospital to assure us of their protection and at the same time made us responsible for their sick and wounded." The British officers stationed at the hospital reported on the cleanliness and high quality of the care provided.  Most civilians deserted the city, leaving the Hôpital Général as a refugee centre for the poor who had nowhere to go.  The nuns set up a mobile aid station that reached out to the cities refugees, distributing food and treating the sick and injured.

British conquest of New France (1754–1763)

In the middle of the 18th century, British North America had grown to be close to a full-fledged independent country, something they would actually become a few decades later, with more than 1 million inhabitants. Meanwhile, New France was still seen mostly as a cheap source of natural resources for the metropolis, and had only 60,000 inhabitants. Nevertheless, New France was territorially larger than the Thirteen Colonies, but had a population less than 1/10 the size. There was warfare along the borders, with the French supporting Indian raids into the American colonies.

The earliest battles of the French and Indian War occurred in 1754 and soon widened into the worldwide Seven Years' War.  The territory of New France at that time included parts of present-day Upstate New York, and a series of battles were fought there.  The French military enjoyed early successes in these frontier battles, gaining control over several strategic points in 1756 and 1757.

The British sent substantial military forces, while the Royal Navy controlled the Atlantic, preventing France from sending much help.  In 1758 the British captured Louisbourg, gaining control over the mouth of the St. Lawrence, and also took control of key forts on the frontier in battles at Frontenac and Duquesne. In spite of the spectacular defeat of the supposed main British thrust in the Battle of Carillon (in which a banner was supposedly carried that inspired the modern flag of Quebec), the French military position was poor.

In the next phase of the war, begun in 1759, the British aimed directly at the heart of New France. General James Wolfe led a fleet of 49 ships holding 8,640 British troops to the fortress of Quebec. They disembarked on Île d'Orléans and on the south shore of the river; the French forces under Louis-Joseph de Montcalm, Marquis de Saint-Veran, held the walled city and the north shore. Wolfe laid siege to the city for more than two months, exchanging cannon fire over the river, but neither side could break the siege.  As neither side could expect resupply during the winter, Wolfe moved to force a battle. On 5 September 1759, after successfully convincing Montcalm he would attack by the Bay of Beauport east of the city, the British troops crossed close to Cap-Rouge, west of the city, and successfully climbed the steep Cape Diamond undetected. Montcalm, for disputed reasons, did not use the protection of the city walls and fought on open terrain, in what would be known as the Battle of the Plains of Abraham. The battle was short and bloody; both leaders died in battle, but the British easily won. (The Death of General Wolfe is a well-known 1770 painting by artist Benjamin West depicting the final moments of Wolfe.)

Now in possession of the main city and capital, and further isolating the inner cities of Trois-Rivières and Montreal from France, the rest of the campaign was only a matter of slowly taking control of the land.  While the French had a tactical victory in the Battle of Sainte-Foy outside Quebec in 1760, an attempt to lay siege to the city ended in defeat the following month when British ships arrived and forced the French besiegers to retreat. An attempt to resupply the French military was further dashed in the naval Battle of Restigouche, and Pierre de Rigaud, Marquis de Vaudreuil-Cavagnial, New France's last Royal governor, surrendered Montreal on 8 September 1760. Because the Seven Years' War was still ongoing in Europe, the British put the region under a British military regime between 1760 and 1763.

Britain's success in the war forced France to cede all of Canada to the British at the Treaty of Paris. The Royal Proclamation of October 7, 1763 by King George III of Great Britain set out the terms of government for the newly captured territory, as well as defining the geographic boundaries of the territory.

The rupture from France would provoke a transformation within the descendants of the Canadiens that would eventually result in the birth of a new nation whose development and culture would be founded upon, among other things, ancestral foundations anchored in Northeastern America. What British Commissioner John George Lambton (Lord Durham) would describe in his 1839 report would be the kind of relationship that would reign between the "Two Solitudes" of Canada for a long time: "I found two nations at war within one state; I found a struggle, not of principles, but of races". Incoming British immigrants would find that Canadiens were as full of national pride as they were, and while these newcomers would see the American territories as a vast ground for colonization and speculation, the Canadiens would regard Quebec as the heritage of their own race - not as a country to colonize, but as a country already colonized.

British North America (1760–1867)

Royal Proclamation (1763–1774)
British rule under Royal Governor James Murray was benign, with the French Canadians guaranteed their traditional rights and customs.   The British Royal Proclamation of 1763 united three Quebec districts into the Province of Quebec.  It was the British who were the first to use the name "Quebec" to refer to a territory beyond Quebec City.  The British tolerated the Catholic Church, and protected the traditional social and economic structure of Quebec. The people responded with one of the highest birth rates ever recorded, 65 births per thousand per year  Much French law was retained inside a system of British courts, all under the command of the British governor.  The goal was to satisfy the Francophile settlers, albeit to the annoyance of British merchants.

Quebec Act (1774) 

With unrest growing in the colonies to the south, which would one day grow into the American Revolution, the British were worried that the Canadiens might also support the growing rebellion. At the time, Canadiens formed the vast majority of the population of the Province of Quebec. To secure the allegiance of Canadiens to the British crown, Governor James Murray and later Governor Guy Carleton promoted the need for accommodations. This eventually resulted in enactment of the Quebec Act of 1774. The Quebec Act was an Act of the Parliament of Great Britain setting procedures of governance in the Province of Quebec. Among other components, this act restored the use of the French civil law for private matters while maintaining the use of the English common law for public administration (including criminal prosecution), replaced the oath of allegiance so that it no longer made reference to the Protestant faith, and guaranteed free practice of the Catholic faith. The purpose of this Act was to secure the allegiance of the French Canadians with unrest growing in the American colonies to the south.

American Revolutionary War

When the American Revolutionary War broke out in early 1775, Quebec became a target for American forces, that sought to liberate the French population there from British rule.  In September 1775 the Continental Army began a two-pronged invasion, with one army capturing Montreal while another traveled through the wilderness of what is now Maine toward Quebec City. The two armies joined forces, but were defeated in the Battle of Quebec, in which the American General Richard Montgomery was slain.  The Americans were driven back into New York by the arrival of a large army of British troops and German auxiliaries ("Hessians") in June 1776.

Before and during the American occupation of the province, there was a significant propaganda war in which both the Americans and the British sought to gain the population's support.  The Americans succeeded in raising two regiments in Quebec, led by James Livingston and Moses Hazen, one of which served throughout the war.  Hazen's 2nd Canadian Regiment served in the Philadelphia campaign and also at the Siege of Yorktown, and included Edward Antill, a New Yorker living in Quebec City (who actually led the regiment at Yorktown as Hazen had been promoted to brigadier general), Clément Gosselin, Germain Dionne, and many others. Louis-Philippe de Vaudreuil, a Quebecker, was with the French Navy in the Battle of the Chesapeake that prevented the British Navy from reaching Yorktown, Virginia.

After General John Burgoyne's failed 1777 campaign for control of the Hudson River, Quebec was used as a base for raiding operations into the northern parts of the United States until the end of the war.  When the war ended, large numbers of Loyalists fled the United States.  Many were resettled into parts of the province that bordered on Lake Ontario.  These settlers eventually sought to separate themselves administratively from the French-speaking Quebec population, which occurred in 1791.

Constitutional Act (1791–1840)

The Constitutional Act of 1791 divided Quebec into Upper Canada (the part of present-day Ontario south of Lake Nipissing plus the current Ontario shoreline of Georgian Bay and Lake Superior) and Lower Canada (the southern part of present-day Quebec). Newly arrived English-speaking Loyalist refugees had refused to adopt the Quebec seigneurial system of land tenure, or the French civil law system, giving the British reason to separate the English-speaking settlements from the French-speaking territory as administrative jurisdictions. Upper Canada's first capital was Newark (present-day Niagara-on-the-Lake); in 1796, it was moved to York (now Toronto).

The new constitution, primarily passed to answer the demands of the Loyalists, created a unique situation in Lower Canada. The Legislative Assembly, the only elected body in the colonial government, was continually at odds with the Legislative and Executive branches appointed by the governor. When, in the early 19th century, the Parti canadien rose as a nationalist, liberal and reformist party, a long political struggle started between the majority of the elected representatives of Lower Canada and the colonial government. The majority of the elected representatives in the assembly were members of the francophone professional class: "lawyers, notaries, doctors, innkeepers or small merchants", who comprised 77.4% of the assembly from 1792 to 1836.

By 1809, the government of Newfoundland was no longer willing to supervise the coasts of Labrador. To solve this issue, and as a result of lobbying in London, the British government assigned the coasts of Labrador to the colony of Newfoundland. The inland border between the jurisdiction of Lower Canada and Newfoundland was not well-defined.

In 1813, Beauport-native Charles-Michel de Salaberry became a hero by leading the Canadian troops to victory at the Battle of Chateauguay, during the War of 1812. In this battle, 300 Voltigeurs and 22 Amerindians successfully pushed back a force of 7000 Americans. This loss caused the Americans to abandon the Saint Lawrence Campaign, their major strategic effort to conquer Canada. In 1831, more than 50,000 people immigrated to Quebec. The next year brought 52,000 individuals and with them the Asiatic cholera, and within five months 4,200 deaths resulted.

Gradually, the Legislative Assembly of Lower Canada, who represented the people, came more and more into conflict with the superior authority of the Crown and its appointed representatives. Starting in 1791, the government of Lower Canada was criticized and contested by the Parti canadien. In 1834, the Parti canadien presented its 92 resolutions, a series of political demands which expressed a genuine loss of confidence in the British monarchy. London refused to consider these and, in response, submitted . Discontentment intensified throughout the public meetings of 1837, sometimes being led by tribunes like Louis-Joseph Papineau. Despite opposition from ecclesiastics, for example Jean-Jacques Lartigue, the Rebellion of the Patriotes began in 1837. Key goals for the rebels were to have responsible government and, for many, to terminate prejudicial dominance of the English minority over the French majority. Louis-Joseph Papineau was instrumental in acting as a leadership figure for the rebels, yet his ideological views were ambiguous concerning the relative importance of seigneurial landowners, the Roman Catholic Church, and the francophone bourgeoisie. Under his influence, the first rebellion of 1837 was directed at the seigneurs and the clergy as much as the anglophone governor. The 1837 rebellion resulted in a declaration of martial law, and suspension of Canada's Constitution. To centralize authority under the Crown, John Lambton, Lord Durham was named governor of all of British North America.

In 1837, Louis-Joseph Papineau and Robert Nelson led residents of Lower Canada to form an armed resistance group called the Patriotes in order to seek an end to the unilateral control of the British governors. They made a Declaration of Independence in 1838, guaranteeing human rights and equality for all citizens without discrimination. Their actions resulted in rebellions in both Lower and Upper Canada. The Patriotes forces were victorious in their first battle, the Battle of Saint-Denis, due to government forces being unprepared. However, the Patriotes were unorganized and badly equipped, leading to them suffering a defeat in their second battle, the Battle of Saint-Charles, and another defeat in their final battle, the Battle of Saint-Eustache. Following the government defeat of the Patriotes, the Catholic clergy recovered their moral authority among the people and preached for the cohesion and development of the nation in the fields of education, health and civil society.

Martial law and Special Council (1838–1840)

The second rebellion in 1838 was to have more far-reaching consequences. In 1838, Lord Durham arrived in Canada as High Commissioner. Although skirmishes with government troops were relatively bloodless during the second rebellion of 1838, the Crown dealt forcefully in punishing the rebels. 850 of them were arrested; 12 were eventually hanged, and 58 were transported to Australian penal colonies.

In 1839, Lord Durham was called upon by the Crown to deliver a Report on the Affairs of British North America as a result of the rebellions. The Special Council that governed the colony from 1838 to 1841 enacted many reforms with the aim of improving economic and bureaucratic affairs, such as land ownership and the establishment of new schools. These institutional reforms ultimately became the foundation of "responsible government" in the colony.

Many American colonists who remained loyal to England left the 13 Atlantic colonies before American independence for Canada, with many settling in communities in southern Quebec.  In the 19th century, Quebec experienced several waves of immigration, principally from England, Scotland and Ireland. At the turn of the 20th century, immigrants to Quebec came mainly from Ireland, but large numbers of immigrants arrived from Germany and other areas of western Europe.

Union Act

Lord Durham recommended that Upper Canada and Lower Canada be united, in order to make the francophone population of Lower Canada a minority within the united territory and weaken its influence. Durham expressed his objectives in plain terms. His recommendation was followed; the new seat of government was located in Montreal, with the former Upper Canada being referred to as "Canada West" and the former Lower Canada being referred to as "Canada East". The Act of Union 1840 formed the Province of Canada. Rebellion continued sporadically, and in 1849, the burning of the Parliament Buildings in Montreal led to the relocation of the seat of government to Toronto. Historian François-Xavier Garneau, like other Canada East francophones during the 1840s, had deep concerns about the united entity and the place of the francophones within it.

This union, unsurprisingly, was the main source of political instability until 1867. The differences between the two cultural groups of the Province of Canada made it impossible to govern without forming coalition governments. Furthermore, despite their population gap, both Canada East and Canada West obtained an identical number of seats in the Legislative Assembly of the Province of Canada, which created representation problems. In the beginning, Canada East was under-represented because of its superior population size. Over time, however, massive immigration from the British Isles to Canada West occurred, which increased its population. Since the two regions continued to have equal representation in the Parliament, this meant that it was now Canada West that was under-represented. The representation issues were frequently called into question by debates on "Representation by Population", or "Rep by Pop". When Canada West was under-represented, the issue became a rallying cry for the Canada West Reformers and Clear Grits, led by George Brown.

In 1844, the capital of the Province of Canada was moved from Kingston to Montreal. 

In this period, the Loyalists and immigrants from the British Isles decided to no longer refer to themselves as English or British, and instead appropriated the term "Canadian", referring to Canada, their place of residence. The "Old Canadians" responded to this appropriation of identity by henceforth identifying with their ethnic community, under the name "French Canadian". As such, the terms French Canadian and English Canadian were born. French Canadian writers began to reflect on the survival of their own. François-Xavier Garneau wrote an influential national epic, and wrote to Lord Elgin: "I have undertaken this work with the aim of re-establishing the truth so often disfigured, and of repelling the attacks and insults which my compatriots have been and still are the daily target of, from men who would like to oppress and exploit them all at every opportunity. I thought the best way to achieve this was to simply expose their story". His and other written works allowed French Canadians to preserve their collective consciousness and to protect themselves from assimilation, much like works like Evangeline had done for Acadians.

Political unrest came to a head in 1849, when English Canadian rioters set fire to the Parliament Building in Montreal following the enactment of the Rebellion Losses Bill, a law that compensated French Canadians whose properties were destroyed during the rebellions of 1837–1838. This bill, resulting from the Baldwin-La Fontaine coalition and Lord Elgin's advice, was a very important one as it established the notion of responsible government. In 1854, the seigneurial system was abolished, the Grand Trunk Railway was built and the Canadian–American Reciprocity Treaty was implemented. In 1866, the Civil Code of Lower Canada was adopted. Then, the long period of political impasse that was the Province of Canada came to a close as the Macdonald-Cartier coalition began to reform the political system.

Grande Hémorragie

In the 1820s and 1830s, rapid demographic growth made access to land in Lower Canada increasingly difficult for young people. Crop failures and political repression in 1838-1839 placed an additional strain on the agricultural sector in the southern part of the colony. Only slowly did French Canadian farmers adapt to competition and new economic realities. According to some contemporary observers, their farming methods were outdated. About this time the textile industry in New England experienced a boom. With living conditions so harsh, and work very hard to find even in the largest city, Montreal, emigration seemed the only option for many. As the first wave moved out in the 1850s, word of mouth soon began to move larger crowds by the late 1870s. Mill owners hired these French immigrants to staff their mills more cheaply than American and Irish-born workers, who were themselves displaced.

When the first wave of emigrants left Quebec, the local government did not pay much attention as the numbers were relatively small. However, when the emigration began to increase and the provincial economy was going through a depression, leaders of the province attempted to halt the emigration. Though a small group of intellectuals believed French-Canadian culture could be recreated or maintained on U.S. soil, many more elites warned against emigration; they argued that cultural and moral perdition would occur south of the border. Instead they proposed domestic colonization in Quebec and the development of the St. Lawrence River valley's periphery. Nevertheless, more than 200,000 left between 1879 and 1901.

Canada (1867–present) 

In the decades immediately before Canadian Confederation in 1867, French-speaking Quebeckers, known at that time as Canadiens, remained a majority within Canada East. Estimates of their proportion of the population between 1851 and 1861 are 75% of the total population, with around 20% of the remaining population largely composed of English-speaking citizens of British or Irish descent. From 1871 to 1931, the relative size of the French-speaking population stayed much the same, rising to a peak of 80.2% of Quebec's population in 1881. The proportion of citizens of British descent declined slightly in contrast, from a peak of 20.4% of the population in 1871, to 15% by 1931. Other minorities made up the remainder of the population of the province.

After several years of negotiations, in 1867 the British Parliament passed the British North America Acts, by which the Province of Canada, New Brunswick, and Nova Scotia joined to form the Dominion of Canada. Canada East became the Province of Quebec. Canada remained self-governing locally, but the British continued to control its external affairs.

After having fought as a Patriote at the Battle of Saint-Denis in 1837, George-Étienne Cartier joined the ranks of the Fathers of Confederation and submitted the 72 resolutions of the Quebec Conference of 1864 approved for the establishment of a federated state -Quebec- whose territory was to be limited to the region which corresponded to the historic heart of the French Canadian nation and where French Canadians would most likely retain majority status. In the future, Quebec as a political entity would act as a form of protection against cultural assimilation and would serve as a vehicle for the national affirmation of the French-Canadian collective to the face of a Canadian state that would, over time, become dominated by Anglo-American culture. Despite this, the objectives of the new federal political regime were going to serve as great obstacles to the assertion of Quebec and the political power given to the provinces would be restricted. Quebec, economically weakened, would have to face political competition from Ottawa, the capital of the strongly centralizing federal state. On July 15, 1867, Pierre-Joseph-Olivier Chauveau became Quebec's first Premier.

Growth of Montreal
Urban expansion characterized Montreal around the time of Confederation, as rural French Canadians moved to the city to find work. Immigrants flocked to Montreal, Canada's largest city at the time, and so did many people from other parts of Canada. Major business and financial institutions were established in Montreal, including the headquarters of several national banks and corporations. Prominent businessmen included brewer and politician John Molson Jr., jeweller Henry Birks, and insurer James Bell Forsyth. Montreal's population grew rapidly, from around 9000 in 1800, to 23,000 in 1825, and 58,000 in 1852. By 1911, the population was over 528,000. The City of Montreal annexed many neighbouring communities, expanding its territory fivefold between 1876 and 1918.  As Montreal was the financial center of Canada during this era, it was the first Canadian city to implement new innovations, like electricity, streetcars and radio.

Influence of the Catholic institutions

Many aspects of life for French-speaking Quebeckers remained dominated by the Catholic Church in the decades following 1867. The Church operated many of the institutions of the province, including most French-language schools, hospitals, and charitable organizations. The leader of the Catholic Church in Quebec was the Bishop of Montreal, and from 1840 to 1876 this was Ignace Bourget, an opponent of liberalism. Bourget eventually succeeded in gaining more influence than the liberal, reformist Institut Canadien. At his most extreme, Bourget went so far as to deny a Church burial to Joseph Guibord, a member of the Institut, in 1874. A court decision forced Bourget to allow Guibord to be buried in a Catholic cemetery, but Bourget deconsecrated the burial plot of ground, and Guibord was buried under army protection. The conservative approach of the Catholic Church was the major force in Quebec society until the reforms of the Quiet Revolution during the 1960s. In 1876, Pierre-Alexis Tremblay was defeated in a federal by-election because of pressure from the Church on voters, but succeeded in getting his loss annulled with the help of a new federal law. He quickly lost the subsequent election. In 1877, the Pope sent representatives to force the Quebecois Church to minimize its interventions in the electoral process.

Catholic women started dozens of independent religious orders, funded in part by dowries provided by the parents of young nuns. The orders specialized in charitable works, including hospitals, orphanages, homes for unwed mothers, and schools. In the first half of the twentieth century, about 2-3% of Quebec's young women became nuns; there were 6,600 in 1901 and 26,000 in 1941. In Quebec in 1917, 32 different teaching orders operated 586 boarding schools for girls. At that time there was no public education for girls in Quebec beyond elementary school. The first hospital was founded in 1701. In 1936, the nuns of Quebec operated 150 institutions, with 30,000 beds to care for the long-term sick, the homeless, and orphans.  Between 1870 and 1950, thousands of young girls were sent to Quebec City, to the reform school (1870–1921) and the industrial school (1884–1950) of the Hospice St-Charles, both operated by the Sisters of the Good Shepherd.

Lionel Groulx wanted to build a nationalistic French-Canadian identity, in purpose to protect the power of the Church and dissuade the public from popular-rule and secularist views.  Groulx propagated French-Canadian nationalism and argued that maintaining a Roman Catholic Quebec was the only means to 'emancipate the nation against English power.'  He believed the powers of the provincial government of Quebec could and should be used within Confederation, to bolster provincial autonomy (and thus Church power), and advocated it would benefit the French-Canadian nation economically, socially, culturally and linguistically.  Groulx successfully promoted Québécois nationalism and the ultra-conservative Catholic social doctrine, to which the Church would maintain dominance in political and social life in Quebec.  In the 1920s–1950s, this form of traditionalist Catholic nationalism became known as clerico-nationalism.

During the 1940s and 1950s Quebec Premier Maurice Duplessis party, the Union Nationale, often had the active support of the Roman Catholic Church during political campaigns, using the slogan Le ciel est bleu; l'enfer est rouge ("Heaven is blue; hell is red"; red is the colour of the Liberal party, and blue was the colour of the Union Nationale).

Politics
The 1885 execution in Saskatchewan of Métis rebel leader Louis Riel resulted in protests in Quebec, as the French Canadians thought they were being deliberately persecuted for their religion and language. Honoré Mercier became the outspoken leader of the protest movement. The federal Cabinet members of the Quebec Conservative Party had reluctantly supported Prime minister Macdonald's decision in favour of execution. Support for Conservatives eroded.

Seizing the opportunity to build a coalition of his Liberals and dissident Conservatives, Mercier revived the "Parti National" name for the 1886 Quebec provincial election, and won a majority of seats.  However, the coalition consisted of mostly Liberals and only a few Conservatives, so the "Liberal" name was soon reinstituted.  The Conservatives, reduced to a minority in the Legislative Assembly, clung to power for a few more months. Mercier became Premier of Quebec in 1887. Seeing provincial autonomy as the political expression of Quebec nationalism, he collaborated with Ontario premier Oliver Mowat to roll back federal centralism.

With his strong nationalist stance, Mercier was very much a precursor of later nationalist premiers in future decades who confronted the federal government and tried to win more power for Quebec. He promoted contacts with francophones in other parts of North America outside of Quebec including Western Canada and New England. Those francophones had not yet been assimilated into the English-Canadian or American culture to the extent they would be in the future.  Mercier promoted reform, economic development, Catholicism, and the French language. He won popularity but also made enemies.  He was returned to the legislature as the Member for the district of Bonaventure and his party won the 1890 election with an increased majority. He was defeated in 1892.

Prime Minister Wilfrid Laurier

In 1896, Wilfrid Laurier became the first French Canadian to become Prime Minister of Canada. Educated in both French and English, Laurier remained in office as Prime Minister until October 1911. Laurier had several notable political achievements in Quebec, among them winning Quebec votes for the Liberal Party, against the desires of the powerful Catholic clergy.

In 1899, Henri Bourassa was outspoken against the British government's request for Canada to send a militia to fight for Britain in the Second Boer War. Laurier's compromise was to send a volunteer force, but the seeds were sown for future conscription protests during the world wars. Bourassa challenged, unsuccessfully, the proposal to build warships to help protect the empire. He led the opposition to mandatory conscription during World War I, arguing that Canada's interests were not at stake. He opposed Catholic bishops who defended military support of Britain and its allies.

Boundaries
As more provinces joined Canadian Confederation, there was a pressing need to formalize provincial boundaries. In 1898, the Canadian Parliament enacted the Quebec Boundary Extension Act, 1898, which gave Quebec a part of Rupert's Land, which Canada had bought from the Hudson's Bay Company in 1870. This Act expanded the boundaries of Quebec northward.  In 1912, the Canadian Parliament enacted the Quebec Boundaries Extension Act, 1912, which gave Quebec another part of Rupert's Land: the District of Ungava. This extended the borders of Quebec northward all the way to the Hudson Strait.

Population migration also characterized life in late 19th century Quebec. In the late 19th century, overpopulation in the Saint Lawrence Valley led many Quebeckers to immigrate to the Saguenay–Lac-Saint-Jean region, the Laurentides, and New England, providing a link with that region that continues to this day. In 1909, the government passed a law obligating wood and pulp to be transformed in Quebec. This helped slow the Grande Hémorragie by allowing Quebec to export its finished products to the US instead of its labour force. Clerico-nationalists eventually started to fall out of favour in the federal elections of 1911.

In 1927, the British Judicial Committee of the Privy Council drew a clear border between northeast Quebec and south Labrador. However, the Quebec government did not recognize the ruling of this council, resulting in a boundary dispute. The Quebec-Labrador boundary dispute is still ongoing today, leading some to comment that Quebec's borders are the most imprecise in the Americas.

First World War 

When World War I broke out, Canada was automatically involved as a Dominion. Many English Canadians voluntarily enlisted to fight. Unlike English Canadians, who felt a connection to the British Empire, French Canadians felt no connection to anyone in Europe. Furthermore, Canada was not threatened by the enemy, who was an ocean away and uninterested in conquering Canada. So, French Canadians saw no reason to fight. Nevertheless, a few French Canadians did enlist in the 22nd Battalion - precursor to the Royal 22e Regiment. By late 1916, the horrific number of casualties were beginning to cause reinforcement problems. After enormous difficulty in the federal government, because virtually every French-speaking MP opposed conscription while almost all the English-speaking MPs supported it, the Military Service Act became law on August 29, 1917. French Canadians protested in what is now called the Conscription Crisis of 1917.

Great Depression
The worldwide Great Depression that began in 1929 hit Quebec hard, as exports, prices, profits and wages plunged and unemployment soared to 30%, and even higher in lumbering and mining districts.  Politically there was a move to the right, as Quebec's leaders noted that across the globe the failures attributed to capitalism and democracy had led to the spread of socialism, totalitarianism, and Civil War.  The Spanish Civil War in particular alarmed devout Catholics, who demanded that Canada keep out representatives of the anti-Catholic Loyalist government of Spain.  There was a wave of clericalism and Quebec nationalism that represented a conservative reaction of a traditional society which feared social change as a threat to its survival.

With so many men unemployed or on lower wages, it was a major challenge for housewives to cope with the shortages of money and resources. Often they updated strategies their mothers used when they were growing up in poor families. Cheap foods were used, such as soups, beans and noodles. They purchased the cheapest cuts of meat—sometimes even horse meat—and recycled the Sunday roast into sandwiches and soups. They sewed and patched clothing, traded with their neighbors for outgrown items, and kept the house colder. New furniture and appliances were postponed until better days. These strategies, Baillargeon finds, show that women's domestic labour—cooking, cleaning, budgeting, shopping, childcare—was essential to the economic maintenance of the family and offered room for economies. Most of her informants also worked outside the home, or took boarders, did laundry for trade or cash, and did sewing for neighbors in exchange for something they could offer.  Extended families used mutual aid—extra food, spare rooms, repair-work, cash loans—to help cousins and in-laws.  Half the devout Catholics defied Church teachings and used contraception to postpone births—the number of births nationwide fell from 250,000 in 1930 to about 228,000 and did not recover until 1940.

The populist poet Emile Coderre (1893–1970), writing as "Jean Narrache" gave voice to the poor people of Montreal as they struggled for survival during the Great Depression. Writing in the language of the street, Narrache adopted the persona of a man living in poverty who reflects on the ironies attending the meagerness of social assistance, the role of class, the pretensions of the commercial elite, and the counterfeit philanthropy of the rich.

There was political alienation as more and more voters complained of the indifference and incompetence of both the national leadership of Prime Minister Bennett and the Conservative party, as well as the provincial leadership of Liberal Premier Louis-Alexandre Taschereau.  Many of the discontented gravitated toward the ultramontane nationalists especially Henri Bourassa, editor of Le Devoir, and the highly traditional Catholic writer Lionel Groulx, editor of L'action canadienne-française. Building on this disenchantment, Maurice Duplessis led the new Union nationale party to victory in 1936 with 58% of the vote and became premier.

Second World War 
Prosperity returned with the Second World War, as demand soared for the province's manpower, raw materials and manufactures.  140,000 young men, both Francophone and Anglophone, rushed to enlist, although English was the dominant language in all the services and essential for promotion.

Duplessis expected to ride antiwar sentiment to victory when he called an election in the fall of 1939. He miscalculated as the Liberals scored a landslide, with 70 seats to only 14 for the Union nationale.

Canadian leaders managed to avoid the depths of the conscription crisis that had soured relations between Anglophones and Francophones during the First World War. During the Conscription Crisis of 1944 Quebecers protested the conscription. Prime Minister William Lyon Mackenzie King tried, but did not succeed in, avoiding full conscription in Canada, and it became a reality in the final months of World War II. However, the end of the war also meant the end of the crisis. MacKenzie King succeeded in portraying himself as "a moderate", and at the same time "limited the ethnic bitterness" that had marked the 1917 conscription crisis.

Maurice Duplessis

Duplessis returned as premier in the 1944 election,  and held power without serious opposition for the next fifteen years, until his death, winning elections in 1948, 1952 and 1956. He became known simply as le Chef ("the boss").  He championed rural areas, provincial rights, and anti-Communism, and opposed the trade unions, modernizers and intellectuals. He worked well with the powerful Anglo businessmen who controlled most of the economy. A highly controversial figure even today, Duplessis and his Union Nationale party dominated the province. Duplessis' years in power have been ridiculed as the La Grande Noirceur ("Great Darkness") by his opponents.  The Duplessis years were ones of close church-state relations. Quebec society remained culturally insular during this period, in contrast to the modernizing influences sweeping through the rest of North America. Traditional Catholic morality and Church doctrine defined many aspects of daily life, highlighting traditionalism. For example, most schools and hospitals were Church-controlled. Births outside marriage were rare, abortion was illegal, and divorce was not fully legalized in Quebec until 1968. In recent years, many people in Quebec have spoken out about exploitation by Church and government institutions during the Duplessis years, such as the tragedy of the Duplessis Orphans.

Agitation for reform came from liberal Quebeckers during the Duplessis years, although such provocative attitudes were often frowned upon and marginalized. In 1948, a collective of artists calling themselves Les Automatistes published , meaning "total refusal". The pamphlet was an attempt to start a new vision of Quebec. It has been described as "an anti-religious and anti-establishment manifesto and one of the most influential social and artistic documents in modern Quebec history". It would have a lasting impact, influencing the supporters of Quebec's Quiet Revolution during the 1960s.

Other signs of frustration with the status quo appeared with the bitter Asbestos Strike of 1949. It led to a greater appreciation of labour and social-democratic issues in Quebec.

In fall of 1950 Rivière-du-Loup was the site of a nuclear accident. A USAF B-50 was returning a nuclear bomb to the USA. The bomb was released due to engine troubles, and then was destroyed in a non-nuclear detonation before it hit the ground. The explosion scattered nearly 100 pounds (45 kg) of uranium (U-238).

Quiet Revolution (1960–1980)

During the 1960s, the Quiet Revolution ushered in an array of socio-political transformations, from secularism and the welfare state to a specifically Québécois national identity. The baby boom generation embraced the changes that liberalized social attitudes in the province.

The 1960s were largely a time of optimism in Quebec. Expo 67 marked Montreal's pinnacle as Canada's largest and most important city and prompted the construction of what is now Parc Jean Drapeau and the Montreal Metro. In 1962, the mayor of Montreal, Jean Drapeau (the man who later was behind Expo 67 and the '76 Olympics projects) instigated the construction of the Metro (subway). The first phase of the subway was completed in 1966. These mega-projects came in the same era as Canada's Confederation centennial celebrations in 1967, when a wave of patriotism swept through most of Canada.

In 1960, the Liberal Party of Quebec was brought to power with a two-seat majority, having campaigned with the slogan "" ("Its time for things to change"). This new Jean Lesage government had the "team of thunder": René Lévesque, Paul Gérin-Lajoie, Georges-Émile Lapalme and Marie-Claire Kirkland-Casgrain. This government made many reforms in the fields of social policy, education, health and economic development. It also created the Caisse de dépôt et placement du Québec, Labour Code, Ministry of Social Affairs, Ministry of Education, Office québécois de la langue française, Régie des rentes and Société générale de financement.

The Quiet Revolution was particularly characterized by the 1962 Liberal Party's slogan "" ("Masters in our own house"), which, to the Anglo-American conglomerates that dominated the economy and natural resources of Quebec, announced a collective will for freedom of the French-Canadian people.

During the Quiet Revolution, the government of Quebec invested heavily in the province's industries. A large component of this was nationalizing some predominant industries into state run business, for example Hydro-Québec, in an attempt to modernize the economy and to encourage the development of francophone businesses. It was during this period that the government established the Caisse de dépôt et placement du Québec, the Régie des rentes and the Société générale de financement to promote the development of the industries in Quebec. In 1961, the Conseil d’orientation économique was established to promote economic growth of the regions of Quebec, growth which was once heavily funded by the Government of Canada.

Confrontations between the lower clergy and the laity began. As a result, state institutions began to deliver services without the assistance of the church, and many parts of civil society began to be more secular. During the Second Vatican Council, the reform of Quebec's institutions was overseen and supported by the Holy See. In 1963, Pope John XXIII proclaimed the encyclical , establishing human rights. In 1964, the  confirmed that the laity had a particular role in the "management of ".

In 1964, British Columbia lent Quebec $100 million. 

In 1965, the Royal Commission on Bilingualism and Biculturalism wrote a preliminary report underlining Quebec's distinct character, and promoted open federalism, a political attitude guaranteeing Quebec to a minimum amount of consideration. To favour Quebec during its Quiet Revolution, Canada, through Lester B. Pearson, adopted a policy of open federalism. In 1966, the Union Nationale was re-elected and continued on with major reforms.

The upheavals of the 1960s were also a time of conflict for some in Quebec. The emergence of extremist nationalist violence marked a dark chapter in the province's history, when in 1963, the first bombs of the Front de libération du Québec were detonated in Montreal. A major recognition of Quebec's cultural importance came in 1964 when, under authority granted by the Government of Canada, the Province of Quebec signed its first international agreement in Paris. The same year, during an official visit by the Queen, the police were required to maintain order during a demonstration by members of the Quebec separatist movement.

Militant activity came to a head in 1970 with the October Crisis, which led to Prime Minister Pierre Trudeau invoking the War Measures Act. In addition, the Quebec Ombudsman Louis Marceau was instructed to hear complaints of detainees and the Quebec government agreed to pay damages to any person unjustly arrested (only in Quebec). On February 3, 1971, John Turner, the Minister of Justice of Canada, reported that 497 persons had been arrested throughout Canada under the War Measures Act, of whom 435 had been released. The other 62 were charged, of whom 32 committed crimes of such seriousness that a Quebec Superior Court judge refused them bail. The crisis ended a few weeks after the death of Pierre Laporte at the hands of his captors. The fallout of the crisis marked the zenith and twilight of the FLQ which lost membership and public support.

Religion and culture
In the midst of the powerful and urban changes, cultural change took root as well. Quebec was greatly affected by the baby boom; between 1960 and 1970, more than 1.2 million Quebeckers reached the age of 14. As more young Québécois rejected Catholic teachings, they made life choices that were a complete change from tradition in the province. Cohabitation rates among young couples rose, as the institution of marriage gradually lost its obligatory status. Births outside of marriage began to rise, from 3.7 percent in 1961 to 10 percent in 1976, then 22 percent by 1984. As of 2015, 62.9% of births were outside of marriage.
Student protests at local universities erupted, mirroring the youth protests throughout the United States and Western Europe during the 1960s and early 1970s. Reforms included an expansion of post-secondary educational opportunities for both English- and French-speaking Quebeckers. In 1968, the Université du Québec à Montréal opened. Protests by English-speaking students led to the establishment of Concordia University in Montreal that same year. The Quiet Revolution combined declericalization with the Church reforms of Vatican II. There was a dramatic change in the role of nuns.  Many left the convent while very few young women entered.  The Provincial government took over the nuns' traditional role as provider of many of Quebec's educational and social services. Ex-nuns often continued the same roles in civilian dress, and men for the first time started entering the teaching profession.

With the Quiet Revolution, Quebeckers affirmed their identity, especially in the arts, culture and language. It was during the revolution that the government of Quebec formed the Ministry of Culture which focused mainly on defending the French language and culture. The transformation of Quebec was also marked by the adoption of the Law on the assurance-hospitalisation, guaranteeing universal health care through a tax-funded public delivery system. In 1964, Quebec had recognized the equality between men and women and allows all women to have jobs which were once exclusively for men.

Separatism

Quebec nationalism, by now popularly termed Quebec separatism, began to gain momentum in the late 1960s as a vocal minority began to push to bring the movement into the mainstream. In 1967, René Lévesque quit the Quebec Liberal Party and founded the Mouvement Souveraineté-Association.

During an official visit to Quebec as a guest of the government of Canada, in front of a huge crowd the President of France, Colonel Charles de Gaulle,who had been temporarily given the rank of general in WWII, undiplomatically declared from the balcony of the Montreal city hall; "Vive le Québec libre!" (Long live free Quebec!). The crowd cheered and applauded loudly. A public outcry erupted over such an unprecedented interference in the affairs of another nation, an act to which the Canadian federal government strongly took offence. De Gaulle abruptly cancelled his visit to Ottawa and went home.

Violence erupted in 1970 with the October Crisis, when Front de libération du Québec members kidnapped British Trade Commissioner James Cross and Quebec Minister of Labour Pierre Laporte.  Pierre Laporte was later found murdered.  Prime Minister Pierre Trudeau used the War Measures Act, which allowed anyone suspected of being involved with the terrorists to be held temporarily without charge. Not all reformists supported Quebec separatism, for example, the editors of the political journal Cité Libre.

Politics
The growth of Quebec's government bureaucracy and its perceived interventionism produced friction with the federal government, particularly since the federal government followed a policy of close centralization.

English-speaking Canada showed concern at the changes happening in Quebec society and the protests of the Québécois. In 1963, Canada's Prime Minister, Lester B. Pearson, asked the famous question, "What does Quebec want?" as he instituted a royal commission of enquiry into bilingualism and biculturalism to find an answer for this question, and to propose measures to satisfy the demands of the Québécois. French-speaking communities beyond Quebec were also pushing for increased linguistic and cultural accommodations; in 1965 the report of the Laurendeau-Dunton royal commission recommended making French an official language in the parliaments of Canada, the provincial assemblies of Ontario and New Brunswick, in federal tribunals and in all federal government administration of Canada.

The implementation of the proposed measures only increased the divide between English Canada and Quebec francophones. English Canadians considered the measures put in place to be unacceptable concessions to francophones, while francophones considered the measures an insufficient response to their aspirations.

Throughout these constant frictions between the federal government and the provincial government, the Quebec nationalist movement transformed itself into an independence movement. The Ralliement national (RN), led by Gilles Grégoire, and the Rassemblement pour l'indépendance nationale (RIN), led by Pierre Bourgault and Hubert Aquin, were founded in 1960 and quickly became political parties. In 1967, René Lévesque, who until then had been a leading figure in the Liberal Party of Quebec, quit the Liberals to found the Mouvement Souveraineté-Association (MSA).

In 1968, the separatist forces reorganized into a single political party, the Parti Québécois, under the leadership of René Lévesque. Separatist parties gained 8% of the popular vote in Quebec in 1966, 23% in 1970 and 30% in 1973. These results were not strong enough to result in a majority in Quebec's provincial assembly, but they showed the rapid development of a separatist ideology in Quebec.

1970–1980

Traditional values continued to be put into question, in particular at the moral and religious level. Every form of authority was questioned, and demonstrations by students and workers' unions were frequent. A noticeable, growing confidence was evident in Quebec, supported by economic and social successes. After a period of rapid change, Quebec paused to search for its path.

A period of fast economic growth was ending. Several factors contributed to the stagnation and even the reduction, in many cases, of the buying power of Québécois:
the gas price shocks of 1973–1974 and of 1979 generated price inflation and high interest rates;
economic growth shrank;
taxes increased to pay for government programs put in place during the period 1960–1975;
governments, struggling with spending and growing deficits, disengaged itself from some services that citizens now had to pay for out of their own pocket; 
globalization of the economy put downward pressure on salaries.

Quebec's Premier Robert Bourassa unveiled plans for the James Bay Project in 1971. It expanded the capacity of Hydro-Québec by creating one of the largest hydro-electric projects in the world and eventually created a new understanding of the relationship between Quebec and the Cree Nation. Tensions with aboriginal groups were to re-emerge in the 1990s during the Oka Crisis Standoffs in Kanesatake and Kahnawake.

1980 referendum
In 1976, the separatist Parti Québécois under René Lévesque was elected, and formed the first separatist government of the province. The Parti Québécois promised in its campaign that it would not declare independence without obtaining a mandate through a referendum. The mandate of the Parti Québécois was to govern the province well, and not to bring about independence. The first years of the Parti Québécois government were very productive and the government passed progressive laws that were well accepted by the majority of the population, such as French language protection laws, a law on the financing of political parties, laws for compensating road accident victims, for protecting farm land, and many other social-democracy-type laws. Even opponents of the Parti Québécois occasionally acknowledged that the Party governed the province well.

On May 20, 1980, the first referendum was held on sovereignty-association, but was rejected by a majority of 60 percent (59.56% "No", 40.44% "Yes"). Polls showed that the overwhelming majority of anglophones and immigrants voted against, and that francophones were almost equally divided.

Constitution Act, 1982
Together with the Canada Act 1982, an Act of Parliament passed by the British Parliament severed virtually all remaining constitutional and legislative ties between the United Kingdom and Canada. The Act was signed by all the provinces except Quebec.

On the night of November 4, 1981, (widely known among Quebec sovereigntists as La nuit des longs couteaux and in the rest of Canada as the "Kitchen Accord") Federal Justice Minister Jean Chrétien met with all of the provincial premiers except René Lévesque to sign the document that would eventually become the new Canadian constitution. The next morning, they presented the "fait accompli" to Lévesque. Lévesque refused to sign the document and returned to Quebec. In 1982, Trudeau had the new constitution approved by the British Parliament, with Quebec's signature still missing (a situation that persists to this day). The Supreme Court of Canada confirmed Trudeau's assertion that every province's approval is not required to amend the constitution. Quebec is the only province not to have formally assented to the patriation of the Canadian constitution in 1982.

Meech Lake Accord and Charlottetown Accord

Between 1982 and 1992, the Quebec government's attitude changed to prioritize reforming the federation. The subsequent attempts at constitutional amendments by the Mulroney and Bourassa governments ended in failure with both the Meech Lake Accord of 1987 and the Charlottetown Accord of 1992, resulting in the creation of the Bloc Québécois.

1995 referendum

On October 30, 1995, a second referendum for Quebec sovereignty was rejected by a slim margin (50.58% "No", 49.42% "Yes"). Instrumental leaders of the Quebec separatist side were Lucien Bouchard and Quebec Premier Jacques Parizeau. Bouchard had left the senior ranks of Prime Minister Brian Mulroney's Progressive Conservative government to form Canada's first federal separatist party (the Bloc Québécois) in 1991 and had become the leader of the Opposition after the 1993 federal election. He campaigned heavily for the "Yes" side against Liberal Prime Minister Jean Chrétien, a major proponent of the federalist "No" side. Parizeau, a longtime separatist who had played an important role in the 1980 referendum, promised a referendum for sovereignty in his electoral campaign leading up to the 1994 provincial election, which had earned him a majority government in the province. In the aftermath of the referendum, he faced criticism when he blamed the loss of the referendum on "money and the ethnic vote" in his concession speech.  Parizeau resigned as Premier and as leader of the Parti québécois the day after his controversial speech, claiming he had always planned to do so in the case of separatist defeat, and Bouchard left federal politics to replace him in January 1996.

Federalists accused the sovereigntist side of asking a vague, overcomplicated question on the ballot. Its English text read as follows:
Do you agree that Québec should become sovereign after having made a formal offer to Canada for a new economic and political partnership within the scope of the bill respecting the future of Québec and of the agreement signed on June 12, 1995?

2000–present

In 1998, following the Supreme Court of Canada's decision on the reference relating to the secession of Quebec, the Parliaments of Canada and Quebec defined the legal frameworks within which their respective governments would act in another referendum. On October 30, 2003, the National Assembly voted unanimously to affirm "that the people of Québec form a nation".

After winning the provincial election in 1998, Bouchard retired from politics in 2001. Bernard Landry was then appointed leader of the Parti Québécois and premier of Quebec. In 2003, Landry lost the election to the Quebec Liberal Party and Jean Charest. Landry stepped down as PQ leader in 2005, and in a crowded race for the party leadership, André Boisclair was elected to succeed him. He also resigned after the renewal of the Quebec Liberal Party's government in the 2007 general election and the Parti Québécois becoming the second opposition party, behind the Action Démocratique.

On November 27, 2006, the House of Commons of Canada passed a motion recognizing that the "Québécois form a nation within a united Canada." The motion was introduced in the House of Commons by the federal government.

In January 2007, The Quebec town of Hérouxville received international attention when its town council passed controversial measures concerning practices which the residents deemed unsuitable for life in Hérouxville for potential new immigrants, despite the fact that the town has no immigrant population. The mayor and the municipal council approved a code of behavior for immigrants, which occurred in the context of a debate on "reasonable accommodation" for other cultures in Quebec. This would start a debate which would lead to the Parti Québécois Quebec Charter of Values. 

Quebec elected Pauline Marois as its first female premier on September 4, 2012. Marois served as leader of the separatist Parti Québécois. The Parti Québécois was elected with a minority of seats in the province's legislative assembly, with remaining seats held by two federalist (non-separatist) parties. Shortly after the election, during a radio network interview in France, Marois stated that another referendum was not conceivable in the current circumstances, although she emphasized that she would support Quebec's interests.

During the 2011 Canadian federal elections, Quebec voters rejected the sovereignist Bloc Québécois in favour of the federalist and previously minor New Democratic Party (NDP). As the NDP's logo is orange, this event was called the "orange wave".

Marois called a provincial election for April 2014, during which her party was defeated by the Parti libéral du Québec (PLQ). The PLQ won by a large margin, securing a majority government. In the 2018 Quebec general election, the Coalition Avenir Québec defeated the Liberals, forming a majority government. François Legault is the current Premier.

In January 2017, A Quebec City mosque was the subject of a mass shooting. There were six deaths and numerous others injured.

In May 2017, floods spread across southern Quebec, with Montreal declaring a state of emergency. 

In 2018, the Coalition Avenir Québec (CAQ), led by François Legault, won the provincial general elections.This marked the first time since the 1966 election, which was won by the now-defunct Union Nationale, that a party other than the Quebec Liberals or the Parti Québécois formed government in Quebec. It was also the first time since then that a centre-right party had won government in the province.

In June 2019, Quebec passed Bill 21, a law which bars public servants from wearing religious symbols while on duty.

In the 2019 Canadian federal election, The Bloc Québécois increased its number of seats from 10 in 2015, to 32 seats in 2019, both over taking the NDP to become the third largest party in Canada and regaining official party status.

Between 2020 and 2021, Quebec took measures to protect itself against the COVID-19 pandemic.

After a 45-year hiatus in language legislation in Quebec, the provincial legislature passed An Act respecting French, the official and common language of Québec in 2022. This act greatly expanded the requirement to speak French in many public and private settings. The preliminary notes of the bill make its purpose clear: "the purpose of this bill is to affirm that the only official language of Québec is French. It also affirms that French is the common language of the Québec nation." This act amended the Charter of the French language and introduced "new fundamental language rights," such as reinforcing French as the language of legislation, justice, civil administration, professional orders, employers, commerce and business, and educational instruction. Premier François Legault and his Coalition Avenir Québec government justified this as necessary to preserve the French language that is central to Quebec nationalism.

The Coalition Avenir Québec Government increased its parliamentary majority in the 2022 Quebec general election. The Liberals dropped to their lowest seat count since 1956 and recorded their lowest share of the popular vote in their history; however, they remained the official opposition. The Parti Québecois had its worst general election result in history, losing most of its seats.

Summary of Quebec's political transformations 
Names in bold refer to provinces, others to sub-provincial levels of government; the first names listed are those areas mostly nearly corresponding to contemporary Quebec.
 Canada, the core of New France (1608–1761): a French colony
 Province of Quebec (1763–1791): a British colony
 Lower Canada, one of the Canadas (1791–1841): a British colony
 the Canada East portion of the Province of Canada (1841–1867): a British colony
 Quebec (1867–present): a province of Canada

See also 

Timeline of Quebec history
History of Montreal
List of National Historic Sites of Canada in Quebec

General:
List of years in Canada
History of Canada
British Empire
List of French possessions and colonies
French colonial empire

References

Primary sources
 Innis, Harold Adams, ed. Select documents in Canadian economic history, 1497-1783 (1929), French documents are not translated by Harold Adams Innis
 ; 707pp

Journals
 Quebec History, large-scale encyclopedia
 Quebec Studies
 Revue d'histoire de l'Amérique française

Further reading
 Brunet, Michel. French Canada in the early decades of British rule (1981) online, 18pp; basic survey
 Cook, Ramsay, ed. French-Canadian Nationalism: An Anthology (1969)
 Coulombe; Pierre A. Language Rights in French Canada (1997)
 Desbiens, Caroline. Power from the North: Territory, Identity, and the Culture of Hydroelectricity in Quebec (2014)
 Dickinson, John A., and Brian Young. A Short History of Quebec ( McGill-Queen's Press 2000)
 Dumont, Micheline et al. (The Clio Collective,) Québec Women: A History (1987)
 Falardeau, Jean-C. and Mason Wade, eds; Canadian Dualism: Studies of French-English Relations (1960), bilingual
 Fraser, Graham (2002). PQ: René Lévesque and the Parti Québécois in Power, Montreal, McGill-Queen's University Press; 2nd edition, 434 pages 
 Fyson, Donald. "Between the Ancien Régime and Liberal Modernity: Law, Justice and State Formation in colonial Quebec, 1760–1867," History Compass 12#5 (2014) pp 412–432 DOI: 10.1111/hic3.12154
 Gagnon, Alain-G., and Mary Beth Montcalm. Quebec Beyond the Quiet Revolution. Scarborough: Nelson, 1990.
 Gagnon, Alain-G. ed. Quebec: State and Society (1984)
 Heintzman, Ralph. "The political culture of Quebec, 1840–1960." Canadian Journal of Political Science 16#1 (1983): 3-60. in JSTOR
 Jenkins, Kathleen. Montreal: Island City of the St Lawrence (1966), 559pp.
 Lachapelle, Guy, et al. The Quebec Democracy: Structures, Processes and Policies. Toronto: McGraw-Hill Ryerson, 1993.
 Laforest, Guy. Trudeau and the End of a Canadian Dream (1995) 
 Langlois, Simon. Recent Social Trends in Quebec, 1960-1990 (1991)
 Lewis, H. Harry. " Population of Quebec Province: Its Distribution and National Origins," Economic Geography (1940) 16#1 pp. 59-68 in JSTOR
 Linteau, Paul-André, René Durocher, Jean-Claude Robert, and Robert Chodos. Quebec: A History 1867–1929 (1983) Quebec Since 1930 (1991), standard 2 vol textbook.
 Linteau, Paul-André, and Peter McCambridge. The History of Montreal: The Story of Great North American City (2013)
 MacDonald, L. Ian. From Bourassa to Bourassa: a Pivotal Decade [i.e. the years 1976-1984] in Canadian History. [S.l.]: Harvest House, 1984. 324 p., ill. with b&w port. photos.  pbk
 McRoberts, Kenneth. Quebec: Social Change and Political Crisis. (McClelland and Stewart, 1988)
 Manning; Helen Taft. The Revolt of French Canada, 1800–1835: A Chapter of the History of the British Commonwealth (1962) online
 Marshall, Bill, ed. France and the Americas: Culture, Politics, and History (3 Vol 2005)
 Moogk, Peter. La Nouvelle France: The Making of French Canada a Cultural History (2000) to 1763
 Ouellet, Fernand. Lower Canada 1791-1840 (1980) a major scholarly survey
 Roberts, Leslie. Montreal: From Mission Colony to World City (Macmillan of Canada, 1969).
 Saywell, John. The Rise of the Parti Québécois 1967–76 (1977)
 Trofimenkoff, Susan Mann. Dream of Nation: a Social and Intellectual History of Quebec. Toronto: Gage, 1983. 344pp; second edition (2003) under the name of Susan Mann.
 Vacante, Jeffery. "The Posthumous Lives of René Lévesque,"  Journal of Canadian Studies/Revue d'études canadiennes (2011) 45#2 pp 5–30 online, 
 Wade, Mason. The French Canadians 1760-1967 (2 vol. 2nd ed. 1975), standard history online
 Weiss, Jonathan, and Jane Moss. French-Canadian Literature (1996)
 Whitcomb, Dr. Ed. A Short History of Quebec''. Ottawa. From Sea To Sea Enterprises, 2012.  92 p. . 92 p.